John Crittenden (1754 – 1809) was a Major in the Continental Army during the American Revolutionary War and a member of the Virginia House of Delegates from 1790 to 1805. He was the scion of a powerful family of politicians and military officers who played key roles in the politics of several southern states through the end of the 19th century.

Crittenden was born in New Kent, Virginia, to Henry Crittenden and Margaret Butler. On August 21, 1783 he married Judith Harris, daughter of John Harris and Obedience Turpin. John and Judith had nine children including the statesmen John Jordan Crittenden and Robert Crittenden.  He was an original member of the Virginia Society of the Cincinnati. He died in Kentucky.

References 

familysearch.org Accessed August 24, 2008
 https://www.americanrevolutioninstitute.org/soldiers-and-sailors-of-the-revolutionary-war/officers-represented-in-the-society-of-the-cincinnati/

Continental Army officers from Virginia
1754 births
1809 deaths
Crittenden family
Members of the Virginia House of Delegates
People from New Kent County, Virginia
18th-century American politicians
19th-century American politicians